Republicans, formerly known as Brazilian Republican Party and formed as Renovator Municipalist Party is a Brazilian political party. Its electoral number is 10 . The party has a strong association with the Universal Church of the Kingdom of God.

History
The party was founded in August 2005 as the Municipalist Renovator Party by pastors of the Universal Church of the Kingdom of God. Lula's Vice President José Alencar moved to PRB on 2005 after leaving the Liberal Party. In March 2006, the party was renamed the Brazilian Republican Party.

The Brazilian Republican Party first fought against President Luiz Inácio Lula da Silva, then rallied behind him after his re-election in 2006. According to one study, the PRB has been supportive of the Lula da Silva and Rousseff presidencies “on the basis of their concern for social democracy and for eliminating inequality.”  However, later PRB started to join the new rising wave conservativism and anti-petism in Brazil and all of the PRB's deputies voted in favor of Dilma's impeachment.

They then supported the government of Michel Temer. In the 2018 presidential election, the Brazilian Republican Party supports the candidate of the Brazilian Social Democracy Party, Geraldo Alckmin. Currently the party supports President Jair Bolsonaro, joining him due strong ideological affinity. For the 2022 Brazilian general election, the Republicans formed a coalition with the Liberal Party (PL) and the Progressives (PP) in order to support Jair Bolsonaro's 2022 presidential campaign. Candidates launched by the Republicans had their image heavily associated and sometimes were endorsed by Bolsonaro.

In August 2019 the Brazilian Republican Party changed its name into Republicanos. Justifying as "the name change reinforces the reformulation of the party's program and statute, “consolidating the position as a party conservative in customs and liberal in the economy”, seeking to emulate the American Republican Party. The name change came with an manifesto adopting a resolute socially conservative position defending christian values, the traditional family and private property.

Participation 
The party leader  was Vitor Paulo dos Santos.

The party's most important members are Bishop Marcelo Crivella, Rio de Janeiro senator and nephew of Universal's founder Bishop Edir Macedo, journalist Celso Russomanno and former Vice-President José Alencar. Famous football player Ronaldinho, also known as Ronaldo de Assis Moreira, joined the party in March 2018.

Statistics 
In 2022, it had 495,136 members.

In 2012, 80% of the members were Catholic, 20% evangelical, including 6 from the universal Church.

Ideology 

The party defines itself as "Socially conservative but economically liberal", defending christian values, the traditional family and private property. The party aligned itself with Jair Bolsonaro during his government from 2018 to 2022.

Some commentators say that the Universal Church of the Kingdom of God (UCKG), a neo-charismatic church that is organized like a business enterprise, has used the party as a base for its bishops to run for political office. The emeritus professor of political sciences from the University of Brasília, David Fleischer, says: "The PRB is an evangelical party." Several members, such as Celso Russomanno, are Catholic. Several leading members, such as Edir Macedo and Marcelo Crivella, have expressed statements of Christian fundamentalism and religious intolerance. A UN report accused members of the UCKG of verbal and physical attacks on members of the Umbanda and Candomblé religions. Macedo considered participating in presidential elections in order to transform Brazil into a theocratic state.

As mayor of Rio de Janeiro, Crivella called the Carnival of Rio de Janeiro an "un-Christian excess" and ordered severe financial cuts for the organisers. Furthermore, he is known for statements of religious intolerance. In his 1999 book Evangelizing Africa, he claimed that homosexuality is a "terrible evil," that Catholics are "demonic", that African religions are based on "evil spirits," and that Hindus drink their children's blood. He has since tried to distance himself from the book, saying that it was the work of a young, immature missionary.

Electoral history

Presidential elections

Legislative elections

Notable members

Current 
 Hamilton Mourão - Current Vice President of Brazil and Senator for Rio Grande do Sul (2023-2031)
 Marcos Pereira - Vice-President of the Chamber of Deputies (2019–present); Federal Deputy for São Paulo (2019–present); President of Republicans (2018–present); Minister of Industry, Foreign Trade and Services (2016-2018)
 Damares Alves - Senator for the Federal District (2023-2031)
 Marcelo Crivella - Mayor of Rio de Janeiro (2017-2021); Minister of Fishing and Aquaculture (2012-2014); Senator for Rio de Janeiro (2003-2017)
 Mecias de Jesus - Senator for Roraima (2019–present)
 Celso Russomanno - Federal Deputy for São Paulo (1995-2011; 2015–present)
 Johnathan de Jesus - Federal Deputy for Roraima (2011–present)
 Silas Câmara - Federal Deputy for Amazonas (1999–present)
 Rosângela Gomes - Federal Deputy for Rio de Janeiro (2015–present)
 Cléber Verde - Federal Deputy for Maranhão (2007–present)
 Pinto Itamaraty - Senator for Maranhão (2016-2017)

Former 
 José Alencar - Vice President of Brazil (2003-2010); Minister of Defense (2004-2006); Senator for Minas Gerais (1999-2002)
 Clarissa Garotinho - Federal Deputy for Rio de Janeiro (2015–present)
 Lincoln Portela - Federal Deputy for Minas Gerais (1999–present)
 Flávio Bolsonaro - Senator for Rio de Janeiro (2020-2021)

References

External links
Republicanos 10 | Portal de Notícias Oficial, Official website

|-

Political parties established in 2005
Conservative parties in Brazil
Social conservative parties
2005 establishments in Brazil
Christian political parties